DC Universe Online (DCUO) is a free-to-play action combat massively multiplayer online game set in the fictional universe of DC Comics. Developed by Dimensional Ink Games and co-published by Daybreak Game Company and WB Games, the game was released on January 11, 2011 for the PlayStation 3, November 15, 2013 for the PlayStation 4 on its launch day, April 29, 2016 for the Xbox One, and August 6, 2019 for the Nintendo Switch.

Gameplay

The player creates a new, original character that interacts with the iconic heroes and villains of DC Comics. Players choose their character's faction (Hero or Villain), gender (male or female), body type (short, medium, tall, spry, athletic, large), personality (comical, flirty, powerful, primal, serious), movement mode (flight, acrobatics, speed or skimming), weapon, and power (fire, ice, gadgets, mental, nature, sorcery, earth, light, electricity, rage, quantum, celestial, munitions, atomic, and water). Numerous hair, skin, and costume types are available, and up to 4 colors can be applied to the color scheme palette. Pre-built templates, inspired by some key DC characters, are available to expedite the character creation process.

When the player's character is named, they are thrown into the world of DC Universe Online with the first experience having to fight their way out of a Brainiac spaceship. The tutorial teaches basic movement and abilities, counter mechanics, and using power and skill points. Eventually the player's character is made an official member of the Justice League (heroes) or The Society (villains), where they continue on their missions to increase their level and skill in various content. Daybreak Game Company is working to make DC Universe Online more interactive than standard MMO games, while trying to keep their key elements which include a leveling system, raid instances, endgame progression and inventories. The world is mainly a shared, public space. The public space features dynamically-generated content designed for both hero and villain player characters to progress and fight alongside and against a multitude of iconic DC Comics characters, moving forward with stories, many of which are brought forth from the pages of DC comics.

DC Universe Online has been actively updating through Game Updates (GU) and Hotfixes. Aside from bug fixes, several Game Updates involve Seasonal Events which provide special feats, styles, base items, overworld missions and instances exclusive to the time frame it runs for, usually a month. There are three Events that tend to cycle throughout the year: Survival Mode, Legends PvE and Stabilizer Fragment Instances. DC Universe Online offers downloadable content (DLC) called Episodes which expand the game universe with new, more difficult missions to progress that provide new or continuations of stories already existing; new costume styles and equipment.

Plot

The opening cinematic takes place in a gritty, war-torn future depicting a final battle between the world's greatest heroes and villains. A future version of Lex Luthor provides voice-over narration. This battle takes place in the ruins of Metropolis. Lex Luthor, wearing a heavy mech armor, commands an army of super-villains that includes Joker, Harley Quinn, Circe, Deathstroke, Black Adam, Giganta, Metallo and Poison Ivy. A scarred, armored Batman commands the heroes, which includes Cyborg, Flash, Green Lantern, Wonder Woman and Green Arrow. Both Poison Ivy and Green Arrow are shown dead at the beginning of the cut scene. The battle culminates with the death of Wonder Woman at Luthor's hands, at which point an unshaven, weary Superman hears her dying screams from orbit and flies to Earth to confront him. As Superman cradles Wonder Woman's dead body, he collapses to the ground and it is revealed that Luthor hid Kryptonite pellets in her mouth as a trap. Luthor impales Superman with a kryptonite-tipped spear, and stands back to proclaim his victory only to see Brainiac's war fleet fill the skies.

The scene then shifts to the present-day Watchtower, where the future Lex Luthor, heavily modified with Brainiac technology, is telling the story to the present-day Superman, Batman, and Wonder Woman. Future Luthor explains that the deadly final war between the heroes and villains was triggered by the subtle manipulations of Brainiac (who had been slowly downloading their powers over time). With the planet's most powerful beings dead, Brainiac intended to use the pirated data to create an army of metahumans under his control, facilitating his conquest of Earth. As the sole survivor of the war, Luthor could do nothing to resist Brainiac's subjugation of the planet. Luthor explains that he was able to survive in secret and eventually steal the stolen data and energy from Brainiac's mothership in the form of "exobytes" (nanobot-sized devices that can bond to a living host and give them their own superpowers). Luthor has traveled into his past to release the exobytes into the atmosphere of present-day Earth. The heroes are outraged, but Luthor explains that because he has done this, soon thousands of new metahumans will be created from ordinary humans (becoming the player-characters of the game). He implores the Justice League to find and train these new metahumans, because Brainiac is coming and the Earth must be ready to succeed where it was once doomed to fail.

When this cinematic ends, the player is brought to the character creation menu to build their new Hero or Villain.

In the second trailer to the game "In Lex we Trust", it is revealed that Lex Luthor's description of events leading up to his arrival in the present time is not as he described to the heroes. The trailer begins with Luthor reviving his companion Fracture from being unconscious. Luthor explains that Brainiac's forces have already penetrated the Fortress of Solitude and that their time is running out. As they approach a time portal chamber, a Brainiac Eradicator attacks and Fracture destroys the robotic drone with a small grenade. The two arrive at the portal which is being stabilized by Batman (whose face is disfigured and arm is replaced by a robotic prosthetic due to injuries from the battle of villains and heroes). As more eradicators enter the chamber, as Luthor lies saying his armor is damaged and that he can not hold them off. Batman tells Fracture to take the canister that contains millions of exobytes and go through the portal, while attacking the Eradicators in order to buy him more time. Fracture thanks Luthor for using the exobytes to give him his powers. Seeing the opportunity he had been waiting for, Luthor kills Fracture describing him as "an excellent lab rat." Before Luthor steps into the portal, Batman calls to Luthor warning that "I'll be coming for you" to which Luthor responds "No, you won't" and activates a self-destruct sequence. Luthor enters the portal and the Fortress of Solitude suffers massive explosions. He arrives in a dark alley, presumably present day. He is greeted by his present-day self who describes him as being late.

At the end of "The Prime Battleground" raid, Future Lex Luthor and Lex Luthor worked together to steal Brainiac's power. Luthor is then betrayed by Future Luthor, wanting the power for himself. It is then revealed Future Batman survived the explosion at the Fortress of Solitude and chased Future Luthor through time. Future Luthor escapes and Future Batman follows him. In the following cut-scene, Future Batman is said to be the last hope for humanity.

Following these events, the heroes led by Future Batman and villains led by Future Luthor to the "Nexus of Reality" (the center of the Multiverse itself) both fight for control, using paradoxes from constant time-travels to alter the histories of iconic characters, forcing heroes and villains to work parallel to each other, changing the timelines in the same fashion. What one causes, the other reverts, thus making an infinite cycle. This results in a massive paradox creature that consumes time itself. In the raid, players must stop the creature from destroying the time-space continuum (one of the many raids where both villains and heroes have the same goal). This event partially ends the storyline the game was based upon, yet opens the possibility to enter many new realities.

Since then, there have been certain stories tied in reflecting the Arrowverse, with the introduction of Nanda Parbat, fighting alongside characters featured in Legends of Tomorrow, and a Supergirl Costume Legends character. Content from the DC Extended Universe has also been released. Other comic centered storylines feature "Sons of Trigon", "Blackest Night", "Amazon Fury", "Halls of Power", "Bombshells Paradox", "Bottle City of Kandor", "Harley Quinn", "Earth 3", "Teen Titans: The Judas Contract", "Justice League Dark", "Dark Nights: Metal" and Birds of Prey in Episodes.

Development
 Concept art for the game was released on July 4, 2008, and the first trailer was released on July 14, 2008. Sony Online Entertainment's goal was to make a different kind of MMO game, with The Incredible Hulk: Ultimate Destruction cited as one of the main inspirations for gameplay.

A beta was available from December 14, 2010, until January 5, 2011. There were a number of technical issues that came to light when the beta was closed, which were partially resolved by the game's release. EverQuest developers Chris Cao and Shawn Lord were involved. Chris Cao was the game director up to May 2011, since stepped down to be replaced by Mark Anderson, previously the art director. Mark Anderson has since been replaced by Jens Andersen, who was promoted to Executive Creative Director of Daybreak Game Company with S.J. Mueller creative director. Comic artists Alé Garza, Carlos D'Anda, JJ Kirby, Oliver Nome, Eddie Nuñez, Livio Ramondelli, and Michael Lopez also contributed to the leveling content headlines and cutscenes. In August 2011, there was a global server merge implemented by the developers to consolidate all PC servers and PlayStation 3 servers into 4 individual servers, one for each platform per region. On September 19, 2011 it was announced that the game would go free-to-play on November 1, 2011, along with the addition of microtransactions. In mid-2013, as part of a hosting deal, accounts for the European PC version were sold to ProSiebenSat.1, however they were still capable of using the US servers. DC Universe Online was announced for the PlayStation 4 on June 5, 2013 along with PlanetSide 2, and was released November 15, 2013. After Sony Online Entertainment (SOE), had announced their All Access Membership changes, SOE and ProSiebenSat.1 parted ways, returning the accounts to SOE. All accounts are managed by Daybreak Game Company.

During the fifth anniversary livestream on January 11, 2016, it was announced that the two regional servers, US and EU would receive cross play, with players on PC able to play with players on the PlayStation version on the same server, only divided by region. An Xbox One version of the game was also announced on January 11, 2016 for release on April 29 of the same year, which launched on two separate regional servers that have since been consolidated into one XB server, not connected to the PC or PS versions of the game. On February 5, both USPC USPS servers were merged into one US server and EUPC and EUPS were merged into one EU server. The same restrictions of not being able to log into or transfer a PS account on PC and vice versa has been maintained.

On October 30, 2017, Daybreak Game Company stated the PlayStation 3 version would shut down on January 31, 2018 to focus on providing a better experience on the PlayStation 4. Utilizing the same PSN, a PlayStation 3 player can access their account on PlayStation 4.

On May 23, 2019, a Nintendo Switch version of the game was announced, set for Summer 2019, and has since released two separate regional USNS and EUNS servers on August 6, 2019.

On January 21, 2020, it was announced that the Daybreak Austin Studio that has developed the game since its conception would become their own studio, Dimensional Ink Games, that will continue developing DC Universe Online and a new high-profile next-generation action MMORPG, with Daybreak Games Company now acting in a publisher role.

In May 2022, it was announced the MMORPG in development was cancelled.

Episodes 
To showcase their ongoing support for DC Universe Online and provide new content that enriches the world of DC Universe Online, Daybreak Game Company has released 44 Episodes. These episodes are available for members who have an active subscription or cost a fee for non-members. Many of the Episodes required users to have completed certain achievements or complete game progression elements to access the content. Players can progress through engaging storylines, earn new achievements, experience new zones, and earn new armor that helps progress their character.

Episode 1: Fight for the Light 
On September 6, 2011, the first DC Universe Online episode, Fight For The Light, was released. This episode allowed players to embark on a new adventure with Green Lantern and Sinestro Corps as their battle becomes the forefront of the episode. Some of the key features of this episode include a new Tier 3 Duo in Ferris Aircraft, two Tier 2 Alerts with Oan Sciencells and S.T.A.R. Labs Research Facility, and a Tier 3 alert in Coast City. This episode also brought the new Controller powerset "Light", based on Green and Yellow lanterns for heroes and villains respectively.

Episode 2: Lightning Strikes 
The second episode, Lightning Strikes, was released on December 6, 2011. This episode allowed players to battle through new open-world solo and group activities in a new high-level open-world map of Central City. Players can explore the origin of The Flash and take on some of his opponents in the villainous Rogues. Some of the key features of this episode include the open-world Central City map with daily Tier 3 missions, nine daily Tier 3 Bounties, and a Flashback Tier 2 Duo. Alongside this content came the new Healer power "Electricity".

Episode 3: The Battle for Earth 
On March 13, 2012, the third episode, The Battle for Earth, was released. This episode largely continued the story in the fight against Brainiac which was one of the main storylines in the DC Universe Online base game. Players would fight for the fate of the universe with cooperative gameplay against Braniac. Some of the key features of this episode include three Tier 2 Duos in Riverfront Center, Gotham Hospital, and Riverside Hotel, one Tier 3 Alert in South Gotham Courthouse, and two Tier 4 Raids in the Gates of Tartarus and The Prime Battleground. In addition, the new Tank power, "Earth" was added in and the Battle For South Gotham featured daily Tier 2 missions.

Episode 4: The Last Laugh 
The fourth episode, The Last Laugh, was released on June 19, 2012. This episode focused on the Joker as he gained access to hero and villain safe houses to stir up additional controversy between the player factions. Some of the key features of this episode include one Tier 3 hero Duo in Shady Nightclub, and one Tier 3 villain Duo in Police Station. This marked the final performance of Arleen Sorkin before her retirement. This was her final time voicing her iconic character Harley Quinn.

Episode 5: Hand of Fate 
On August 14, 2012, the fifth episode, Hand of Fate, was released. The episode revolved around DC hero Doctor Fate and would give players a chance to fight through new mystical story content. Some of the key features of this episode include two Tier 4 4-player Operations in Wayward Souls, and Soul Alchemy. In addition, this episode released four Tier 4 8-player Operations in With a Vengeance, A Black Dawn, Unpaid Dues, and Seeds of Rot.

Episode 6: Home Turf 
The sixth episode, Home Turf, was released on January 29, 2013. The episode focused on both new and iconic locations that DC fans would be familiar with as they battle through new objectives and missions. Some of the key features of this episode include two daily Tier 4 hero missions located at Ace Chemicals and Stryker's Island, two daily Tier 4 villain missions located at Steelworks and Arkham Island, and daily Tier 4 Bounties.

Episode 7: Origin Crisis 
On May 8, 2013, the seventh episode, Origin Crisis, was released. The episode continued the story from The Battle for Earth episode, as players travel through time to fight for control of space, time, and the universe itself. Some of the key features of this episode include two Tier 5 Challenges in Iconic Anomolay: The Hunt and Iconic Anomaly: Test Subject #1, two Tier 5 4-Player Operations in Brothers in Arms and Family Reunion, and two Tier 5 Raids in Nexus of Reality and Paradox Wave while introducing the new Controller power, Quantum, where players control time and space.

Episode 8: Sons of Trigon 
The eighth episode, Sons of Trigon, was released on August 29, 2013 for subscribers, and September 3, 2013 for those players who did not have an active subscription. The episode focused on going against DC villain Trigon as he takes over an alternate Gotham City. Some of the key features of this episode include a new location in Gotham Wastelands with daily Tier 5 missions, three Tier 5 Duos in Tunnel of Lust, Ruined Cathedral, and Knighsdome Arena, one Tier 5 Alert, and DC hero Raven featured as a weekly Tier 5 Bounty. Continuing the new trio of new powers, this episode brought the combo-based "Celestial" Healer power.

Episode 9: War of the Light Part I 
On January 22, 2014, the ninth episode, War of the Light Part I, was released. The episode revolved around the continuing battle between the Lantern Corps in Metropolis. Some of the key features of this episode include two Tier 5 4-Player Operations in Mist Recovery and Strike Team, one Tier 5 8-Player Operation in Assault and Battery, a new location in Downtown Metropolis Battlezone with weekly Tier 5 missions, and gave players access to either Ranx's Command Center or Mogo's Command Center. And finishing the new powers trio, it brought "Rage" as a tank power based on the Red Lanterns.

Episode 10: Amazon Fury Part I 
The tenth episode, Amazon Fury Part I, was released on April 30, 2014 for players with an active subscription, and May 6, 2014 for players who did not have an active subscription. The episode focused on the battle between DC hero Wonder Woman and her mother Queen Hippolyta. Some of the key features of this episode include two Tier 6 Challenges in Aegis of Truth and Circe's Trial, two Tier 6 Duos in Port of Paradise and Supply Lines, one Tier 6 Alert in Themyscira Divided, and a new location in Gotham Under Siege with daily Tier 6 missions.

Episode 11: Halls of Power Part I 
On August 6, 2014, the eleventh episode, Halls of Power Part I, was released. The episode revolved around the New Gods of the Fourth World as they sought new ways to take control and engage in strategic battles on a cosmic level. Some of the key features of this episode include one Tier 6 4-Player Operation in Intergang Crime Wave, one Tier 6 Alert in Security Breach, one Tier 6 8-Player Operation in Artifacts from the Past, and two Tier 6 Raids in Relics of Urgrund and Lockdown.

Episode 12: War of the Light Part II 
The twelfth episode, War of the Light Part II, was released on November 11, 2014 for players who had an active subscription, and November 18, 2014 for players who did not have an active subscription. The episode revolved around continuing the story first started in War of the Light Part I and the battle between the Lantern Corps. Some of the key features of this episode include one Tier 6 Challenge in Spark of Parallax, one Tier 6 Duo in Spark of Ion, one Tier 6 Alert in Zamaron Conversion Chamber, two Tier 6 4-Player Operations in Avarice Impurity and Rage Impurity, one Tier 6 8-Player Operation in Love and War, and featured a return to the Downtown Metropolis Battlezone location.

Episode 13: Amazon Fury Part II 
On February 3, 2015 for members and February 12th, 2015 for non-members, the thirteenth episode Amazon Fury Part II, was released for players with an active subscription and players without respectively. The episode revolved around continuing the story first started in Amazon Fury Part I as players would continue the fight against the Amazon queen Hippolyta. Some of the key features of this episode include two Tier 6 Operations in Return to the Nexus and Act of Defiance, three Tier 6 Raids in Labyrinth of Lost Souls, Halls of Hades, and Throne of the Dead, in addition to a return to Gotham Under Siege location with daily Tier 6 missions.

Episode 14: Halls of Power Part II 
The fourteenth episode, Halls of Power Part II, was released on May 12, 2015 for players with an active subscription, and May 19, 2015 for players without an active subscription. The episode revolved around continuing the story first started in the Halls of Power Part I episode, as players would continue their battle against the New Gods. Some of the key features of this episode include two Tier 7 Duos in Resource Recovery and League Hall: Malfunction, one Tier 7 4-Player Operation in Fatal Exams, one Tier 7 8-Player Operation in New Genesis Now, one Tier 7 Raid in Happiness Home, and a new location in New Genesis which gave players access to daily Tier 7 missions.

Episode 15: Bombshells Paradox & Corrupted Zamaron 
On August 5, 2015 for members and August 12th, 2015 for non-members, the fifteenth episode Bombshells Paradox & Corrupted Zamaron, was released for players with an active subscription and without respectively. The episode revolved around players traveling to an alternate WW2-inspired universe where the DC Bombshells were faced with an infinite timeline war. Some of the core features of this episode include one Tier 7 8-Player Operation called The Bombshell Paradox, and one Tier 7 Duo in Corrupted Zamaron.

Episode 16: Desecrated Cathedral and Oa Under Siege 
The sixteenth episode, Desecrated Cathedral and Oa Under Siege, was released on September 2, 2015 for members, and September 9th, 2015 for non-members. The episode revolved around players defending OA as it faced a new threat from the Black Lantern Corps, and a new storyline with DC hero Raven. Some of the core features of this episode include one Tier 7 Alert in Desecrated Cathedral and one Tier 7 Challenge in Oa Under Siege.

Episode 17: Unholy Matrimony & The Flash Museum Burglary 
On October 7, 2015 for members and October 14th, 2015 for non-members, the seventeenth episode, Unholy Matrimony and The Flash Museum Burglary, was released. The episode revolved around players continuing the storyline told in Episode 16 Desecrated Catherdral and a continuation of the League of Assassins storyline that started in Episode 15 The Bombshells Paradox. Some of the core features of this episode include one Tier 7 8-Player Operation in Unholy Matrimony and one Tier 7 Duo in Flash Museum Burglary.

Episode 18: The Demon's Pit and Blackest Day 
The eighteenth episode, The Demon's Pit and Blackest Day, was released on November 4, 2015 for members, and November 11th, 2015 for non-members. The episode revolved around players finishing the War of the Light saga and combating the League of Assassins' interest in Central City. Some of the core features of this episode include one Tier 7 8-Player Operation in Blackest Day and one Tier 7 Duo in The Demon's Pit.

Episode 19: The Demon's Plan and Deep Desires 
On December 2, 2015 for members and December 9th, 2015 and non-members, the nineteenth episode, The Demon's Plan and Deep Desires, was released. The episode revolved around concluding the League of Assassins storyline and served as an epilogue to the Episode 17 Unholy Matrimony storyline. Some of the core features of this episode include one Tier 7 Alert in The Demon's Plan and one Tier 7 Duo in Deep Desires.

Episode 20: Blackest Night & Wastelands Wonderland 
The twentieth episode, Blackest Night and Wastelands Wonderland, was released on January 6, 2016 for members with a subscription, and January 13, 2016 for players without an active subscription. The episode revolved around players fighting The Blackest Night and dealing with the fallout from the War of the Light saga. Some of the core features of this episode include one Tier 7 8-Player Operation in Blackest Night and one Tier 7 Duo in Wastelands Wonderland.

Episode 21: Prison Break and The First Piece 
On February 4, 2016, and February 10, 2016, the twenty-first episode, Prison Break and The First Piece, was released. The episode revolved around working with a new stranger that asks the player to go on a couple of adventures. Some of the core features of this episode include one Tier 7 2-Player Operation in The First Piece and one Tier 7 8-Player Operation in Prison Break.

Episode 22: Science Spire and The Phantom Zone 
The twenty-second episode, Science Spire and The Phantom Zone, was released on March 2, 2016 for members and March 9th, 2016 for non-members. The episode revolved around dealing with Phantom Zone malfunctions and sightings of a mysterious figure near the Science Spire. Some of the core features of this episode include one Tier 7 Challenge in The Science Spire and one Tier 7 4-Player Operation in The Phantom Zone.

Episode 23: The Will of Darkseid and Brainiac's Bottle Ship 
On April 6, 2016 for members and April 13th, 2016 for non-members, the twenty-third episode, The Will of Darkseid and Brainiac's Bottle Ship, was released. The episode revolved around dealing with prisoners who had escaped from the Phantom Zone and a potential new invasion from Darkseid's forces. Some of the core features of this episode include one Tier 7 2-PLayer Operation in The Will of Darkseid and one Tier 7 8-Player Operation in Braniac's Bottle Ship.

Episode 24: Harley's Heist and Darkseid's War Factory 
The twenty-fourth episode, Harley's Heist and Darkseid's War Factory, was released on May 19, 2016. The episode revolved around dealing with the continuation of the Darkseid storyline started several episodes earlier, and some potential nefarious actions being taken by DC villain Harley Quinn. Some of the core features of this episode include one Tier 8 Duo in Harley's Heist and one Tier 8 Raid in Darkseid's War Factory.

Episode 25: Iceberg Lounge and A Rip In Time 
On June 29, 2016, the twenty-fifth episode, Iceberg Lounge and A Rip In Time, was released. The episode revolved around a new location for fans to experience in the Iceberg Lounge, and a continuation of the mysterious figure players interacted with in the Episode 21 storyline. Some of the core features of this episode include one Tier 8 Challenge in the Iceberg Lounge and one Tier 8 4-Player Operation in A Rip In Time.

Episode 26: Wayne Manor Gala and Kandor Central Tower 
The twenty-sixth episode, Wayne Manor Gala and Kandor Central Tower, was released on July 27, 2016. The episode revolved around the continuation of the Harley Quinn storyline started in Episode 24, and the Phantom Zone storyline started in Episode 22. Some of the core features of this episode include one Tier 8 Duo in Wayne Manor Gala and one Tier 8 Raid in Kandor Central Tower.

Episode 27: Amazon Fury: Part III 
On November 17, 2016, the twenty-seventh episode, Amazon Fury Part III, was released. The episode revolved around concluding the Amazon Fury storyline from Episodes 10 and 13. Some of the core features of this episode include one Tier 8 Challenge in Seeing Shades Again, one Tier 8 Duo in Raising Hades, one Tier 8 4-Player Operation in Underworld Trials, two Tier 8 Raids in Olympus and God of Monsters, and Typhon's Monster Invasion which featured both daily and weekly Tier 8 missions.

Episode 28: Age of Justice 
The twenty-eighth episode, Age of Justice, was released on May 31, 2017. The episode revolved around players traveling back through time to save a new impending threat. Some of the core features of this episode include two Tier 8 4-Player Operations in Saving Justice and War Crimes, two Tier 8 Raids in Justice For All and Ultimate Soldier, and Time-Torn Area 51 and War-Torn Village which both featured daily and weekly Tier 8 missions.

Episode 29: Riddled With Crime 
On September 20, 2017, the twenty-ninth episode, Riddled With Crime, was released. The episode revolved around players dealing with a potential gang war brewing between the Riddler's crew and Joker's gang. Some of the core features of this episode include two Tier 8 Duos in Turf War: Team joker and Turf War: Team Riddler, one Tier 8 4-Player Operation in Rise of the Bat, one Tier 8 Raid in Gotham City Zoo, and new daily and weekly Tier 8 missinos in Amusement Mile's Gang War.

Episode 30: Earth 3 
The thirtieth episode, Earth 3, was released on November 15, 2017 and based on the comics saga "Crisis on Earth 2". The episode revolved around players fighting the villains from Earth 3 once more. Some of the core features of this episode include one Tier 8 2-Player Operation in The Visitor, one Tier 8 Alert in Injustice System, two Tier 8 Raids in The Panopticon and The Escape, along with new daily and weekly Tier 8 missions in Gotham Tricorner Yards for the first time.

Episode 31: Deluge 
On March 29, 2018, the thirty-first episode, Deluge, was released. The episode revolved around dealing with a new invasion from Starro. Some of the core features of this include one Tier 9 1-Player Operation in Stemming the Tide, one Tier 9 Duo in Spreading Spores, one Tier 9 Alert in Invasion, two Tier 9 Raids in The Threat Below and Spindrift Station, along with new daily and weekly Tier 9 missions in Central City Starro Deluge Zone.

Celebration Episode: The Death of Superman 
The Death of Superman was released in between Episode 31 and 32 highlighting Superman's 80th anniversary and the release of Action Comics #1000 as a celebration, provided as free content to all players. The episode's storyline was released in three parts with Part 1 being released on May 16, 2018, Part 2 on June 5, 2018, and Part 3 on June 27, 2018. The episode revolved the return of Superman villain Doomsday. Some of the core features of this episode include one Solo Challenge, one Tier 9 raid in The Death of Superman, new daily and weekly tier missions, and a new open world zone in Doomed Metropolis.

Episode 32: Teen Titans: The Judas Contract 
Loosely based on the comics saga "The Judas Contract", the thirty-second episode, Teen Titans: The Judas Contract, was released on July 18, 2018. The episode revolved around players interacting and working with the Teen Titans in the Titans Tower as they look for new recruits and face the betrayal of Terra. Some of the core features of this episode include one Tier 9 Duo in Titans Training Sim, one Tier 9 Alert in Titans Targeted, two Tier 9 Raids in H.I.V.E. Reborn, and The Machine, along with new daily and weekly Tier 9 missions on Titans Island.

Episode 33: Atlantis 
On November 8, 2018, the thirty-third episode, Atlantis, was released. The episode's storyline revolved around players journeying to Atlantis to save the city and assist Aquaman in securing his power and seat on the throne. Some of the core features of this episode include one Tier 9 Challenge in Royal Palace, one Tier 9 Alert in Silent School, one Tier 9 Raid in Crown of Thorns, one Tier 9 8-Player Operation in The Throne, and a new open-world zone in Atlantis with new daily and weekly Tier 9 missions.

Episode 34: Justice League Dark 
The thirty-fourth episode, Justice League Dark, was released on March 28, 2019. The episode's storyline revolved around players working with John Constantine and the other members of the Justice League Dark to find artifacts that will be useful in fighting back new demonic threats. Some of the core features of this episode include one Tier 9 Duo in Pub Crawl, one Tier 9 4-Player Operation in Darkness Rising, one Tier 9 8-Player Operation in Fellowship of the Arcane, one Tier 9 Raid in Shattered Gotham, and new open-world zone in Chaos Gotham with daily and weekly Tier 9 missions.

Episode 35: Metal Part I 
On September 12, 2019, the thirty-fifth episode, Metal Part I, was released. The episode's storyline revolved around players working with heroes and villains to search for Batman in order to fight against the Dark Knights, twisted amalgamated evil versions of Batman and other Justice League heroes or villains from the Dark Multiverse while also fighting a metal plague infecting the city. Some of the core features of this episode include one Tier 9 Solo in Scarlet Speedster, one Tier 9 4-Player Operation in Batcave Breach, two Tier 9 8-Player Operations in False Idols and Monsters of Metal, and a new open-world zone with us going to the original Gotham Tricorner's Yard called Metal Gotham City with new daily and weekly Tier 9 missions.

Episode 36: Metal Part II 
The thirty-sixth episode, Metal Part II, was released December 5, 2019. The episode's storyline revolves on completing the storyline set up in Metal Part I, with Barbatos appearing once the world has been brought into the Dark Multiverse, continuing the fight against new and returning Dark Knights, while aiding Batman, Hawkgirl and the rest of the Justice League to save earth. Some of the core features of this episode include one Tier 10 2-Player Operation in Batscape, one Tier 10 4-Player Operation in Damage Control, two Tier 10 8-Player Raids in The Phoenix Cannon and Into the Dark Multiverse, and a new open-world zone in Thanagar with new daily and weekly Tier 10 missions.

Episode 37: Birds of Prey 
On April 16, 2020, the thirty-seventh episode, Birds of Prey, was released. The episode's storyline revolved around players working with heroes and villains associated with the Birds of Prey and Superman to search for Lex Luthor after LexCorp Tower is supposedly attacked, leading into a search for what plans he has for the multiverse, while finding out he has only been aiding the Justice League in order to destroy them and attain source energy. Some of the core features of this episode include one Tier 10 Solo in LexCorp Tower, one Tier 10 4-Player Alert in Volcano Mining Facility, two Tier 9 8-Player Raids in The Clock Tower and Fire & Brimstone, and new open-world zone in BoP: Metropolis with new daily and weekly Tier 10 missions.

Episode 38: Wonderverse 
The thirty-eighth episode, Wonderverse, was released July 30, 2020. The episode's storyline revolves on continuing the storylines set up in Metal Part II, Birds of Prey, Bombshells Paradox, Amazon Fury and Halls of Power episodes with a Council of Wonder Women being formed by Nubia, consisting of Wonder Woman of the main continuity, Bombshells Wonder Woman, Flashpoint Wonder Woman and Red Son Wonder Woman, appearing together in order to stop the Olympian gods, such as Zeus, Hera, Athena and Ares and New Gods such as Darkseid, Grail, Steppenwolf, Kalibak, Orion and Poseidon all fighting to acquire source shards to empower themselves. Not every member of the council however is completely ready to help the cause. Some of the core features of this episode include one Tier 10 Solo in Temple of Source Powers (four different versions), one Tier 10 4-Player Alert in Crypt of Penthesilea, one Tier 10 8-Player Raid in Fractured God Sphere, and a new open-world zone in Patchwork Themyscira, which is the island Wonder Woman hails from, merged with the different universe's Wonder Women corresponding realities versions of their island, enemies and allies, with new daily and weekly Tier 10 missions, including a new open-world boss system.

Episode 39: Long Live The Legion 

Episode thirty-nine was released on November 5, 2020. This episode is set in the 31st Century Metropolis, featuring the heroic team known as the Legion of Super-Heroes and Teen Titans of present day, with characters facing off against Mordru, Emerald Empress and Validus (who appears on the promotional images for the episode), plus evil and mind controlled versions of the Legionnaires themselves.

Episode 40: World Of Flashpoint 

On April 15, 2021, this episode was released. It features the alternate Flashpoint timeline, where every character is different due to a change The Flash made. Work alongside Batman (Thomas Wayne) of this universe, Cyborg, The Flash and Kid Flash to set things right.

Episode 41: House of Legends 

This episode released on August 25, 2021, provides both hero and villains a cross-faction headquarters for the first time. Meet with The Monitor to learn more of the upcoming storyline everyone will be facing in the upcoming episodes. The House of Legends contains several alternate reality versions of heroes and villains that characters have aided or defeated before are all working together against the inevitable arrival of an universal being known as Perpetua. Tempus Fuginaut and Harbinger also are heavily featured and introduced. It is based on The Multiversity's version of the House of Heroes, but repurposed to house villains as well, explaining the name, which can also be seen as a nod to "Legends of Tomorrow". Content was restructured with this Episode, changing Tiers, Combat Rating requirements and several other aspects of the game.

Episode 42: Legion of Doom 
This episode released on December 9, 2021. It's part one of two of a story line that began in Metal. Lex Luthor had formed a new Legion of Doom in service of the malevolent creator of the Multiverse, Perpetua. Martian Manhunter leads the way and tries to thwart Lex's endgame.

Episode 43: Dark Knights 
This episode released on April 14, 2022. It's part two of two of a story line that began in Metal as well as serving as the finale of the Metal story line. Perpetua's endgame is revealed to be the complete destruction of the multiverse. Wonder Woman, Batman, Superman, and Lex Luthor (who Perpetua betrayed when he failed her) are what stands between Perpetua and a Multiversal-Armageddon.

Episode 44: The Sins of Black Adam  
This episode released on October 26, 2022. Black Adam makes a deal with Neron to save his eternal love, Isis. But Neron tricks him. Black Adam joins with Shazam and Mary Marvel to contend with Neron and his forces for the future of Kahndaq and to rescue Isis.

Seasonal Content 

In addition to episodes, Daybreak also releases seasonal-themed content throughout the year, which rewards players with new feats, seasonal styles, base items and trinkets.

Anti-Monitor Anniversary Event 
Released in January each year (starting in 2017) to celebrate the game's anniversary, this content focuses on an attack by the Anti-Monitor on the DC Universe. Content features an open world area of Metropolis-based around the Science Spire which is under attack from Qwardian invaders from the Anti-Matter universe, a single player challenge set in the Earth-3 Panopticon where players must rescue Alexander Luthor from Johnny Quick, and an 8-player raid where players face off against the Anti-Monitor and his army. Players are rewarded with Qwardian Crowns which can be used to purchase items from the event vendor.

Love Conquers All 
The February seasonal content is based around Valentine's Day. Originally released in 2011 and titled Valentine's Day, the event featured a daily mission for heroes becoming cherubs and a separate one for villains becoming imps which lead to a fight with Aphrodite and rewarded styles, feats and collection items. Player reaction to the event was mostly negative, which led to the content being scrapped due to "quality concerns". The event reappeared in a limited fashion in 2013, when Daybreak released a single mission that granted players all the feats and styles which were part of the original event. 2014 also featured the same solo mission, as well as a second mission which rewarded two new t-shirt styles. The content made a full return in 2015 under the new title, Love Conquers All, which features several hero and villain missions, as well as a 4-player Alert. The event has been updated each year since with new feats, styles, and base items.

Mxyzptlk's Mischief 
Released to coincide with St. Patrick's Day, this content has an Irish theme featuring the mischievous entity from the 5th Dimension, Mr. Mxyzptlk. The content features an open world daily mission, and races located around the Daily Planet area of Metropolis. Players are rewarded with Four-Leaf Clovers which can be used to purchase items from the event vendor.

Springtime 
This content features missions based around Spring renewal and Swamp Thing. There is an open world daily mission based in Gotham City where Poison Ivy has invaded and turned the citizens of Gotham into plant monsters. In addition to the open world mission, there is also a 4-player Alert where players must help release Swamp Thing from Ivy's control. Players are rewarded with Seed Pods that can be used to purchase items from the event vendor.

Tides of War 
This event is released in the summer and has an Atlantean theme. Players must help Aquaman to repel an attack from his brother, Ocean Master, on the surface world. Villain players assist Ocean Master in attacking Aquaman's forces. The content features an open world mission based in the waters around Metropolis, and a 4-player Alert in which players must take on Ocean Master or Aquaman directly depending on your faction. Sand Dollars are the unique currency gained from this event, and can be used to purchase items at the event vendor.

The Witching Hour 
Originally the 2011 Halloween content was a version of the Scarecrow mission based in Gotham Sewers under the title Halloween Spook-tacular. However the player reaction to the event was largely negative due to it being seen as a rehash of an existing mission. The following year the content was replaced by a new event titled The Witching Hour. The new content featured an open world mission for all players and a 4-player Alert called The Midnight Masquerade, in which players must face off against Klarion the Witch Boy and his pet cat Teekl.

Season's Greedings 
This Christmas themed event features the Orange Lantern, Larfleeze, as he seeks to steal all the Christmas presents, trees and cakes for himself. Players can partake in an open world mission to retrieve those items from Larfleeze's Orange Lantern constructs, as well as take on Larfleeze directly in a 4-player Alert. As of 2017, all players were granted a special Christmas tree base item which gives out daily rewards over the 12 days of Christmas. In addition to the usual feats, styles and base items, the content also rewards players with snowballs which they can use to have snowball fights with each other.

Comics
DC Comics announced in January 2010 that they would be releasing DC Universe Online: Legends, a 52-issue weekly limited series (along the lines of previous similar series like 52, Countdown to Final Crisis and Trinity) which would be based on the game. Rather than a weekly series, the format was changed to a bi-weekly series, with comic book writer Tony Bedard and game writer Marv Wolfman, and with artists Howard Porter and Adriana Melo. The title was launched in February 2011 and concluded in May 2012.

Reception

DC Universe Online received mixed to positive reviews from critics, having received 7/10 from IGN at initial launch and showing further improvement with 8/10 from IGN after its PlayStation 4 launch.

As of August 2014, the game has 18 million registered users, and is the number one revenue generating free-to-play title on the PlayStation 3 and 4. As of September 30, 2020, DC Universe Online had 419,000 monthly active players and 40,000 subscribers.

References

External links
 
 Dimensional Ink Games website
 Daybreak Games website
 DC Universe Online @ Fandom.com (Fan-maintained wiki site since 2008)

2011 video games
Active massively multiplayer online games
Massively multiplayer online role-playing games
Free-to-play video games
Massively multiplayer online games
Nintendo Switch games
Persistent worlds
PlayStation 3 games
PlayStation 4 games
PlayStation 5 games
Sony Interactive Entertainment games
Superhero crossover video games
Unreal Engine games
Video games about time travel
Video games based on DC Comics
Video games based on Justice League
Video games developed in the United States
Video games about parallel universes
Video games set in psychiatric hospitals
Video games set in the 31st century
Video games with cross-platform play
Warner Bros. video games
Windows games
Works by Geoff Johns
Xbox One games
Open-world video games
Video games set in the Middle East
Video games set in the United States
Video games set in Australia
Video games set in Asia
Video games set in Atlantis
Video games set in California
Video games set in Europe
Video games set in Louisiana
Video games set in Kansas
Video games set in New Jersey
Video games set in Nevada
Video games set in the Soviet Union
Video games set in Washington, D.C.
Video games set on the Moon
Video games set on fictional planets
Video games set on fictional islands